Charles W. Walton (November 13, 1875 – March 19, 1945) was an American lawyer and politician from New York.

Life
He was the son of James Walton and Ida (Terwilliger) Walton. He attended Kingston Academy. Then he studied law, was admitted to the bar in 1897, and practiced in Kingston, New York.

Walton was a member of the New York State Senate from 1915 to 1922, sitting in the 138th, 139th, 140th, 141st (all four 27th D.), 142nd, 143rd, 144th and 145th New York State Legislatures (all four 29th D.).

During the 1930s, he was Secretary of the New York State Bar Association.

He died in Kingston on March 19, 1945, after an illness of several weeks.

References

 New York Red Book (1922; pg. 84)
 New York History: Quarterly Journal of the New York State Historical Association (Vol. 26; 1945; pg. 547)

1875 births
1945 deaths
Republican Party New York (state) state senators
Politicians from Kingston, New York